Smith's snake skink (Nessia bipes), also known as the two-legged nessia, is a species of skink endemic to island of Sri Lanka.

Habitat & distribution
A burrowing skink from eastern Knuckles Mountain Range. Known localities are few and include Gammaduwa and Matalapitiya.

Description
Midbody scales rows 28. Body slender and equal girth from head to tail. Snout broad and obtuse. Fore limbs absent. Hind limbs  vestigial and appear as buds. 
Dorsum brown or light reddish brown, hatchlings are dark gray or black.

Ecology & diet
Hides under rubble, decaying logs and in leaf liter in submontane forests, at elevations of up to 750m. When exposed, they immediately wriggle into loose soil or under rubble. Feeds on insects.

Reproduction
Lay 2-4 eggs in loose soil in March, April, or May.

References
 http://reptile-database.reptarium.cz/species?genus=Nessia&species=bipes
 http://animaldiversity.ummz.umich.edu/accounts/Nessia_bipes/classification/
 Photos of Smith's Snake Skink

Reptiles of Sri Lanka
Nessia
Reptiles described in 1935
Taxa named by Malcolm Arthur Smith